King's Cliffe (variously spelt Kings Cliffe, King's Cliff, Kings Cliff, Kingscliffe) is a village and civil parish on Willow Brook, a tributary of the River Nene, about  northeast of Corby in North Northamptonshire.

Population
The 2001 Census recorded a parish population of 1,137 people, increasing to 1,202 at the 2011 Census.

The 1871 Census recorded a parish population of 1259. The 1891 Census recorded the parish population as having fallen to 1,082, occupying 262 "inhabited houses"

King's Cliffe is very small but is growing in size. There is a school named King's Cliffe Endowed Primary. It used to be located next to John Wooding's Groceries but in recent years, a new building was developed on King's Forest. This new school is very large in size and is very advanced.

Parish church
The Church of England parish church of All Saints has a central tower that is Norman, with late 13th century upper parts and broach spire. The nave has a Decorated Gothic west window and there are north and south aisles with 14th century arcades. The font is also 14th century. Later features are the Perpendicular Gothic clerestory, roof and remodelling of the north and south arches supporting the tower. Inside the church is a monument erected in 1623 to the Thorpe family, whose descendant John Thorpe (1565–1655) was a notable Elizabethan and Jacobean architect.

Economic and social history
Hall Yard Farmhouse was built in 1603. Inside the house, Dr Law's Music Room has an 18th-century Georgian coved ceiling with decoration in the style of Robert Adam. Law's Chapel, also 18th century, is nearby.

Parts of King's Cliffe Manor House are early 17th century.

In the summer of 1845, the Reverend Miles Joseph Berkeley, the rector of All Saints' church, proposed, after observing potatoes from near the village struck by potato blight, that the causative agent of the blight was a fungus. This was contradictory to theories at the time, which suggested that the fungus was merely a symptom of decay, and not the causative agent of the blight. Berkeley labelled the fungus he found Botrytis infestans, now known as Phytophthora infestans.

King's Cliffe is unusual in having three sets of almshouses. The John Thorpe Almshouses were built in 1668, the Widows' Almshouses in 1749 and the Spinsters' Almshouses in 1754. The Widows' and Spinsters' almshouses were part of a set of charities founded by Rev. Dr William Law (1686–1761) and his disciple, Mrs Elizabeth Hutcheson. A house dating from about 1700 was made a Schoolmaster's House in 1745, and next to it the Boys' School was built in 1748. From 1752 the Schoolmaster's House became Law's Library, which housed Law's religious books and lent them to people of King's Cliffe and neighbouring towns.

The London and North Western Railway opened it in 1879 and British Railways closed it in 1966.

RAF King's Cliffe was opened in 1942 and returned to agricultural use in 1959.

Notable residents
Henry Bonney D.D. (1780–1862) -  churchman and author
James Humphreys – English crime writer, a former resident of the neighbouring village of Apethorpe. His novel Sleeping Partner is partly set in King's Cliffe.
William Law (1686–1761) – Church of England divine
John Thorpe (1565–1655) – architect
 Fenech-Soler –  electronic band

Village Events 
Kings Cliffe has a number of events that occur annually. These include but are not limited to:

 The Village Duck Race - A charity event raising money for The Underground. 
 Cliffe Fest - A family friendly festival raising money for Kings Cliffe Endowed Primary School and local charities. 
 Plant Sale - A charity event run by The Gardening Club raising funds for Kings Cliffe Parish Church.
 Village Bonfire - A charity event raising funds for the Kings Cliffe Parish Church.
 Village Produce Show - A village event run by the Gardening Club.

References

Further reading

External links

Parish Council King's Cliffe Parish Council Website
Village Forum King's Cliffe Village Forum
Geograph images database of images of the village and surrounding areas
King's Cliffe Heritage - local history resource

Villages in Northamptonshire
North Northamptonshire
Civil parishes in Northamptonshire